Juan Manuel 'Juanma' Ortiz Palazón (born 1 March 1982) is a Spanish footballer who plays mainly as a right midfielder.

After starting out at Atlético Madrid he went on to spend most of his professional career with Almería, appearing in 151 official matches over two spells (16 goals) whilst playing in four La Liga seasons with the club. He also competed professionally in Scotland and Cyprus.

Club career

Early years
Born in Guardamar del Segura, Province of Alicante, Valencia, Ortiz was a graduate of Atlético Madrid's youth system, where he played five first-team games during the 2003–04 season, three as a starter.

He had previously made his debut with the main squad in the 2001–02 campaign, appearing in one Segunda División match as the Colchoneros were promoted, and would spend the next three years on loan at both CA Osasuna and Polideportivo Ejido, the latter in the second level.

Almería
For 2007–08, Ortiz joined newly promoted UD Almería, where he was instrumental in helping the Andalusia side overachieve to a final eighth place in La Liga. He scored two goals, including in a 4–1 away win against neighbours Sevilla FC on 19 April 2008, and continued to be regularly used in the following top-flight seasons, inclusively as an attacking right-back.

Ortiz played as both right and left-back during the 2010–11 campaign. He netted twice in the Copa del Rey, both in a 4–3 victory over RCD Mallorca (8–6 on aggregate) in the round of 16, as the team eventually reached the competition's semi-finals for the first time in their history, being nonetheless relegated after ranking 20th and last.

From 2007 to 2009, Ortiz was one of three Almería players with that surname, Mané and José Ortiz being the others.

Rangers
Ortiz signed for Scottish Premier League club Rangers on 6 July 2011, on a three-year contract. He made his first competitive appearance 17 days later, struggling to make an impact and playing out of position in a 1–1 away draw with Heart of Midlothian. He scored his first official goal on 18 August, in a UEFA Europa League qualifier against NK Maribor.

On 30 January 2012, after a somewhat disappointing first half to his Rangers campaign, it was announced that Ortiz would rejoin Almería on loan until the end of the season. He netted three times in his first three games, awarding his team nine points after strikes against Córdoba CF (2–1, home), Girona FC (1–0, away) and Real Murcia (4–2, home).

Return to Spain
Following Rangers' liquidation after they entered administration, several players refused to have their contracts transferred to a new company set up by Charles Green, and both Ortiz and the club agreed on having his link terminated. On 10 July 2012, he signed a two-year contract with Granada CF.

Having signed in the summer of 2014 at the age of 32, Ortiz then spent several seasons in the Cypriot First Division with AEK Larnaca FC, sharing teams with a host of compatriots. On 29 September 2017, he returned to his country and signed with amateurs CF La Nucía, helping to a first-ever promotion to the Segunda División B in 2019.

Ortiz returned to Tercera División in December 2019, joining CF Intercity.

Career statistics

References

External links

1982 births
Living people
People from Vega Baja del Segura
Sportspeople from the Province of Alicante
Spanish footballers
Footballers from the Valencian Community
Association football defenders
Association football midfielders
Association football utility players
La Liga players
Segunda División players
Segunda División B players
Tercera División players
Segunda Federación players
Atlético Madrid B players
Atlético Madrid footballers
CA Osasuna players
Polideportivo Ejido footballers
UD Almería players
Granada CF footballers
Hércules CF players
CF La Nucía players
CF Intercity players
Scottish Premier League players
Rangers F.C. players
Cypriot First Division players
AEK Larnaca FC players
Spanish expatriate footballers
Expatriate footballers in Scotland
Expatriate footballers in Cyprus
Spanish expatriate sportspeople in Scotland
Spanish expatriate sportspeople in Cyprus